Firewall is a 2006 action thriller film directed by Richard Loncraine and written by Joe Forte. The film stars Harrison Ford as a banker who is forced by criminals, led by Paul Bettany, to help them steal $100 million, with Virginia Madsen, Mary Lynn Rajskub, Robert Patrick, Robert Forster, and Alan Arkin. It was initially titled The Wrong Element and was going to be directed by Mark Pellington, but he left production in August 2004 after the death of his wife. Loncraine replaced him two months later.

Firewall received negative reviews from critics with criticism for its plot and editing, with some comparing it unfavorably to James Bond. It grossed almost $83 million at the box office.

Plot
Jack Stanfield is chief of security of Landrock Pacific Bank in downtown Seattle. He is visited by a collection agency, claiming he owes $95,000 to their online gambling site. Believing the incident is due to an identity theft, Jack entrusts a colleague Harry Romano to take care of the claim. He goes out for a drink with Harry who introduces him to Bill Cox, a potential partner. After they leave, Cox follows Jack into his car and forces him to drive home at gunpoint. At home, Jack finds his wife Beth and two children unharmed, but under surveillance by Cox's henchmen.

The next morning, Jack is given instruction to transfer $10,000 each from the bank's 10,000 largest depositors – $100 million total – to Cox's bank account. Cox rigs Jack with a camera and microphone to make sure he cannot ask for help without them knowing.

At Landrock Bank, Cox visits Jack, reintroducing himself as Bill Redmond, a potential partner. Cox asks Jack to give him a tour of the bank's security system. On the way back home, Jack attempts to bribe a henchman to betray Cox, but Cox kills the henchman. At home, Jack attempts an escape with his family, but his attempt is foiled. In retaliation, Cox gives Jack's son Andy a cookie containing nut products, sending him into an anaphylactic shock. Cox withholds the treatment (an EpiPen), until Jack acquiesces to their plan.

The next day, Cox forces Jack to fire his secretary Janet, fearing that she is growing suspicious. Jack initiates a wire transfer to send the money to Cox's offshore accounts. Before leaving, Jack uses an employee's camera phone to take a picture of the account information on the screen. Cox then begins covering his tracks. He forces Jack to delete security data and surveillance tapes and use a virus to cripple the building's system into disarray. Returning home, Jack finds the house empty except for Liam, one of Cox's men.

Realizing Cox has no intention of letting him live, Jack kills Liam with a heavy glass blender. He calls Harry, but his colleague doesn't answer. Jack goes to Harry's house to inquire about Cox. However, Cox kills Harry with a gun he had earlier confiscated from Jack. Beth, held at gunpoint, leaves a message suggesting an affair on Harry's answering machine. This implicates Jack in Harry's death. In addition, the $95,000 debt will be considered motive for Jack embezzling the bank's money.

Jack turns to Janet, who helps him retrieve the phone with the picture of Cox's account information. Jack hacks into Cox's Cayman Island accounts and transfers the money away. He calls Cox using Liam's phone and they arrange to free his family in exchange for returning the money. During the conversation, Jack hears the family dog in the background, and realizes he can locate his family by the GPS tracking unit in the dog's collar. The signal leads him to an abandoned house. He tells Janet to call the police and approaches the house.

When one of his henchmen, Vel, takes pity on the family, Cox kills him. Jack's daughter Sarah runs out of the house. Another henchman, Pim, chases after her, but Jack rams him with Janet's car, which hits an RV that explodes, killing Pim and destroying the car. Cox takes Beth and Andy to the upper floor. Jack enters the house and engages Cox in a final showdown. Their fight eventually leads them into a ditch Cox had dug for Jack's family. Cox temporarily gains the upper hand, but Jack impales Cox with a pickaxe, killing Cox and saving his family. Jack reconciles with them before they all start to head back home.

Cast
 Harrison Ford as Jack Stanfield, chief of security of Landrock Pacific Bank
 Virginia Madsen as Beth Stanfield, Jack's wife
 Jimmy Bennett as Andy Stanfield, Jack and Beth's son
 Carly Schroeder as Sarah Stanfield, Jack and Beth's daughter
 Mary Lynn Rajskub as Janet Stone, Jack's secretary
 Robert Patrick as Gary Mitchell, Jack's colleague
 Robert Forster as Harry Romano, Jack's colleague who introduces him to Bill Cox
 Alan Arkin as Arlin Forester, Jack and Harry's employer
 Paul Bettany as Bill Cox, a businessman who holds Jack and his family hostage and forces Jack to transfer $100 million from the bank he works at to his offshore accounts.
 Vincent Gale as Willy, one of Cox's henchmen
 Kett Turton as Vel, one of Cox's henchmen who has compassion for Jack's family
 Nikolaj Coster-Waldau as Liam, one of Cox's henchmen
 Vince Vieluf as Pim, Cox's most sadistic henchman
 Matthew Currie Holmes as Bobby, Landrock Pacific Bank employee
 Beverley Breuer as Sandra
 Ty Olsson as Airport traffic cop

Reception

Box office
Firewall opened theatrically on February 10, 2006 in 2,840 venues, earning $13,635,463 in its opening weekend, ranking fourth in the domestic box office. The film ended its run fourteen weeks later, on May 18, 2006, having grossed $48,751,189 in the United States and Canada, and $34,000,000 internationally for a worldwide total of $82,751,189. The film was released in the United Kingdom on March 31, 2006, and opened on #7.

Critical reception
The film received largely negative reviews from critics. On review aggregator website Rotten Tomatoes, the film has an 18% rating based on 159 reviews, with an average rating of 4.6/10. The site's consensus states: "Harrison Ford's rote performance brings little to this uninspired techno heist film whose formulaic plot is befuddled with tedious and improbable twists." Metacritic reports a 45 out of 100 rating based on 38 critics, indicating "mixed or average reviews". Audiences polled by CinemaScore gave the film an average grade of "B+" on an A+ to F scale.

Awards

Home media
Firewall was released on DVD and HD DVD on June 6, 2006 and opened at #2 at the sales chart of DVDs, grossing $10.8 million off 596,000 units. As per the latest figures, 1,286,600 units have been sold translating to $21.1 million in revenue.

See also
 List of American films of 2006
 List of films featuring home invasions
 List of films featuring surveillance
 Tiger kidnapping

References

External links

 
 
 
 

2006 films
2000s English-language films
2006 action thriller films
2006 crime thriller films
American action thriller films
Australian action thriller films
American crime thriller films
Australian crime thriller films
Films scored by Alexandre Desplat
Films about computing
Films about extortion
Films about families
Films about kidnapping
Films directed by Richard Loncraine
Films produced by Armyan Bernstein
Films set in Seattle
Films shot in Vancouver
Techno-thriller films
Beacon Pictures films
Village Roadshow Pictures films
Warner Bros. films
Films produced by Basil Iwanyk
Thunder Road Films films
2000s American films